Beaubec-la-Rosière is a commune in the Seine-Maritime department in the Normandy region in northern France.

Geography

History
Formed by the merger in 1825 of Beaubec-la-Ville, whose original Scandinavian name means ‘’beautiful stream’’ and La Rosière which owes its name to the many reeds of the wetlands. The rivers Epte and Andelle have their source nearby.
Founded in 1127 by Hughes de Gournay, the abbey of Bellus-Beccus housed the relics of St Helier, martyred in Jersey in the 6th century. The abbey was destroyed by fire in 1383 and partially rebuilt in the 15th and 18th century. The abbey was looted, sold and demolished during the French Revolution. All that remains are the chapel of St. Ursula and a few traces of the infirmary, the farm and dependencies.

Population

Places of interest
 Traces of a motte at Mont Grippon.
 The ruins of the ancient abbey.
 A thirteenth-century stone cross, 5m in height.
 The church of the Holy Trinity, dating from the nineteenth century.
 A thirteenth-century chapel.
 The church of La Rosière, dating from the thirteenth century.

See also
Communes of the Seine-Maritime department

References

Communes of Seine-Maritime